The Very Best of The Commodores may refer to:
 The Very Best of The Commodores (1985 album)
 The Very Best of The Commodores (1995 album)